Sukashitrochus estotiensis is an extinct species of minute sea snail, a marine gastropod mollusk or micromollusk in the family Scissurellidae, the little slit snails.

Description
The length of the shel attains 0.74 mm.

Distribution
This species was found in the Landes, France.

References

 Lozouet P. (1999). Nouvelles espèces de gastéropodes (Mollusca: Gastropoda) de l'Oligocène et du Miocène inférieur d'Aquitaine (sud-ouest de la France). Partie 2. Cossmanniana. 6: 1-68.
 Geiger, D.L. (2012). Monograph of the little slit shells. Volume 1. Introduction, Scissurellidae. pp. 1-728. Volume 2. Anatomidae, Larocheidae, Depressizonidae, Sutilizonidae, Temnocinclidae. pp. 729-1291. Santa Barbara Museum of Natural History Monographs. Number 7.

External links
 To World Register of Marine Species

Scissurellidae
Gastropods described in 1999